John McQuillan may refer to:
John McQuillan (footballer), Scottish footballer
John M. McQuillan (born 1949), American computer scientist
Jack McQuillan, Irish politician